The ABC Unified School District is a school district that is based in Cerritos, California, United States.

ABCUSD serves the cities of Artesia, most of Cerritos, Hawaiian Gardens, the portion of Lakewood east of the San Gabriel River, as well as tiny portions of Long Beach, Norwalk, and La Mirada (the ABC portion of La Mirada contains only business areas, no residents).

"ABC" stands for Artesia (founded in 1875), Bloomfield (founded in 1885), and  Carmenita (founded in 1902), three districts which were unified in 1965.

List of schools

Adult schools
ABC Adult School is a public local adult school, established by the ABC Unified School District and headquartered in Cerritos, California.

Continuation schools
Tracy High Continuation School (Cerritos)

7-12 schools
Whitney High School (Cerritos)

High schools
Artesia High School (Lakewood)
Cerritos High School (Cerritos)
Gahr High School (Cerritos)

Middle schools
Carmenita Middle School (Cerritos) 
Fedde Middle School (Hawaiian Gardens) 
Haskell Middle School (Cerritos) 
(Faye) Ross Middle School (Artesia) 
Tetzlaff Middle School (Cerritos)
Bloomfield Middle School (Cerritos) is proposed.

Elementary schools
Aloha Health Medical Academy (Lakewood) -
Bloomfield Elementary School (Hawaiian Gardens) (closed in the 1980s)
Bragg Elementary School (Cerritos)
Burbank Elementary School (Artesia)
Cabrillo Lane Elementary School (Cerritos) (Closed)
Carver Elementary School (Cerritos)
Cerritos Elementary School (Cerritos)
Elliott Elementary School (Artesia)
Furgeson Elementary School (Hawaiian Gardens)
Gonsalves Elementary School (Cerritos)
Hawaiian Elementary School (Hawaiian Gardens)
Juarez Elementary School (Cerritos)
Kennedy Elementary School (Artesia)
Frank Leal Elementary School (Cerritos)
Melbourne Elementary School (Lakewood)  (Cerritos)
Niemes Elementary School (Artesia)
Patricia Nixon Elementary School (Cerritos)
Palms Elementary School (Lakewood) 
Cecil B. Stowers Elementary School (Cerritos)
Willow Elementary School (Lakewood)
Helen Wittmann Elementary School (Cerritos)

Nixon Elementary

The Patricia Nixon Elementary School is located in Cerritos.  It was built in 1973 and has grades kindergarten through sixth.  The school is named after the late First Lady of the United States Pat Nixon. Patricia Nixon Elementary School was recognized as a California Distinguished School in 2004 and 2008.

Board of Education

ABC Unified School District's Board of Education members are elected by geographical district, to a four-year term. The elections were held on the first Tuesday after the first Monday in November of odd-numbered years until the 2017 election. Effective with the November 2020 US General election, elections are held in even-numbered years.

References

External links

District website
 List of school districts in Los Angeles County, California
Sacramento Bee: LA judge nixes dismissal of ex-principal lawsuit 
Long Beach Press Telegram: Former principal's lawsuit claims she was demoted for reporting alleged death threats 
Los Cerritos Newspaper: Court Rules ABC School District Fabricated Evidence Used to Demote Former Stowers Principal 

 
School districts in Los Angeles County, California
Education in Long Beach, California
Norwalk, California
1965 establishments in California
School districts established in 1965
Artesia, California
Cerritos, California
Lakewood, California
Pat Nixon